The 44th Army Corps was an Army corps in the Imperial Russian Army.

Part of
10th Army: 1915–1916
4th Army: 1916–1917
7th Army: 1917
Russian Special Army: 1917

References 
 

Corps of the Russian Empire